Fikret Hajiyev (May 19, 1964, Qızılhacılı, Goranboy District – May 5, 1992, Goranboy District, Azerbaijan) was the National Hero of Azerbaijan, and the warrior of the Karabakh war.

Biography 
He was born on May 19, 1964, in the village of Qızılhacılı in the Goranboy District. In 1978, he graduated from the eighth grade and got an electrical specialty at Ganja Technical School. He was born on May 19, 1964, in the village of Qızılhacılıin the Goranboy District. In 1978, he graduated from the eighth grade and got an electrical specialty at Ganja Technical School. In 1982 he was called up for military service by the Military Commissariat of the Goranboy region.  He completed his education at Baku Cooperative Technical School.

Military activities 
At the end of 1991, he went to the frontline as a volunteer. He participated in the defense battalion of Shafaq, Zeyve, Karachinar and other settlements of Goranboy District. Fikret Hajiyev died in battles around Goranboy District on May 5, 1992.

Memorial 
He was posthumously awarded the title of "National Hero of Azerbaijan" by Presidential Decree No. 833 dated 7 June 1992. He was buried in the Qızılhacılı village cemetery. Balliqaya village secondary school is named after him.

See also 
 First Nagorno-Karabakh War

References

Sources 
Vugar Asgarov. Azərbaycanın Milli Qəhrəmanları (Yenidən işlənmiş II nəşr). Bakı: "Dərələyəz-M", 2010, səh. 108.

1964 births
1992 deaths
Azerbaijani military personnel
Azerbaijani military personnel of the Nagorno-Karabakh War
Azerbaijani military personnel killed in action
National Heroes of Azerbaijan
People from Goranboy District